Clemente "Sungo" Carreras González (March 25, 1914 – November 19, 1989) played in the Negro leagues from 1937 to 1941. He played for the New York Cubans in 1938, 1940 and 1941 and for the Cuban Stars in 1937 and 1939. He was born in La Habana, Cuba. He later managed in the Mexican League, the highest level of professional baseball in Mexico. He skippered the Monterrey Sultanes from 1962 to 1964, the Angeles de Puebla in 1976 and the Tampico Alijadores in 1977. He was elected to the Cuban Baseball Hall of Fame in 1998.

References

External links
 and Baseball-Reference Black Baseball / Mexican League stats and Seamheads

1914 births
1990 deaths
Caribbean Series managers
Cuban Stars (East) players
Mexican League baseball managers
Minor league baseball managers
New York Cubans players
20th-century African-American sportspeople